A Ticket to Tomahawk is a 1950 American Western film directed by Richard Sale and starring Dan Dailey and Anne Baxter. It was released by 20th Century Fox. Marilyn Monroe appeared in one of her earliest roles.

Plot
In 1876, Johnny Jameson (Dan Dailey), a "drummer" (traveling salesman), is the only passenger on the inaugural run of the Tomahawk and Western Railroad's narrow gauge train through the Colorado Rockies. The train is pulled by the Tomahawk and Western's only locomotive, a Baldwin ten-wheeler named Emma Sweeny.

During the ride, the conductor tells Johnny that certain people, stagecoach operators for example, would like to see the railroad's franchise fail. Soon afterwards, Dakota (Rory Calhoun), Trancas and Gila, who work for Colonel Dawson, the area stageline operator, cause a giant boulder to fall directly in the path of the train. Engineer Terence Sweeny (Walter Brennan) manages to stop the train in time, and he and the crew then disembark to move the rock.

Johnny decides to walk to the town of Epitaph and hitches a ride with Trancas and Gila. At the sheriff's office, when Johnny tries to report the train's delay to deputy Chuckity Jones (Charles Kemper), he is knocked out by Trancas. U.S. Marshal Dodge, meanwhile, is in the room next door getting ready to welcome the train with help from his tomboyish, knife-wielding granddaughter Kit (Anne Baxter). As they leave for the depot they are surprised by Trancas and Gila. The marshal shoots Trancas but is wounded by Gila. Johnny comes round and Kit suspects that he may also be one of the gang. Despite Chuckity intervening on his behalf she orders him to leave town before sunset.

Kit is deputized as a U.S. Marshal by her grandfather, who now cannot travel because of his wound. She and an Indian companion named Pawnee (Chief Yowlachie) are assigned to escort the train to Tomahawk. Colonel Dawson orders Dakota to join the posse that is escorting the train and also an Indian scout, Black Wolf, to stir up the local Arapahos. Other gang members plot to blow up the engine during a night stop.

Only after he has bought his ticket out of town does Sweeny learn that there is no track laid for the next forty miles. He is informed by local railway entrepreneur, Bishop, that the rails were lost at sea en route from England. Bishop explains that, as the train must reach Tomahawk to fulfill the requirements of the franchise contract, he has arranged for the Emma Sweeny to be hauled by a team of mules. Another condition is that the train must reach Tomahawk by a rapidly approaching deadline with at least one paying passenger. Kit is not pleased to discover that the passenger assigned to her care is Johnny, who is now reluctant to travel on the train. Johnny is roped to the side of the engine, and the locomotive, minus its passenger car, sets off pulled by the mules and accompanied by assorted wagons. Chinese laundry man Long Time (Victor Sen Yung) joins the group with much delayed laundry for Tomahawk, together with Madame Adelaide (Connie Gilchrist) and her dancing girls, Annie, Ruby, Clara (Marilyn Monroe) and Julie. A musician with pianola accompanies them.

As planned, Dawson's men Bat, Charley and Fargo show up at a night stop claiming to be telegraph men who are there to repair lines cut by the Arapahos. Kit gives them permission to bunk in the camp. Johnny convinces Madame Adelaide and the dancers to put on a show in the camp, and later joins in the musical performance himself. Kit gradually softens her attitude towards Johnny.

When all are asleep, Bat and Charley leave while Fargo tosses sticks of dynamite under the engine. Johnny, sleeping alongside the train, smells the lit fuse and alerts the others. Kit cuts the fuse with a shot and disables Fargo, but before he can talk, Dakota kills him.

Some time later, a few miles beyond where the track restarts, Bat and Charley are placing dynamite charges under a trestle. Johnny, Kit and Pawnee are scouting ahead and stop at the bridge. Bat and Charley consider shooting them, but are then themselves attacked and killed by Indians, and the dynamite is set off prematurely. Kit, Johnny and Pawnee are chased back to the train, which is then attacked by the war party. Johnny identifies the Arapaho chief, Crooked Knife, having previously worked with him in a travelling western show.

After the war party is driven off, Johnny volunteers to talk peace with him. He has learned that Long Time is carrying a load of fireworks and develops a plan. He is welcomed by Crooked Knife, who agrees to allow the train safe passage. However, some of the braves distrust Johnny and ask him to produce a sign that he is "big medicine." Johnny sets off a rocket, signaling Kit and Dakota to set off the rest of the fireworks on a nearby hill, and the Indians are impressed. As the railway bridge is now out, Kit intends to take the locomotive over a mountain by dismantling it and carrying it in pieces. Dawson, meanwhile, thinks he has been double-crossed and shoots Black Wolf. He then rounds up his men for a final showdown.

The Emma Sweeny is stripped of her cab, smokestack, tender and various other parts, and hauled over the mountain by the mules in several pieces. When they reach the track, the engine is put back together. Kit discovers that the water tower needed to fill the tender has been sabotaged by Dakota, but unknown to Dakota, the tender was already filled with water.

When Kit discovers that he sabotaged the tower, Dakota jumps aboard the train, slugs Johnny and forces the fireman to start the engine moving, leaving Kit and the rest of the party behind. Kit jumps into the cab. Dakota tries to shoot Kit, but is out of ammunition and throws his gun at her instead, knocking her unconscious. Johnny wakes up, and while he and Dakota fight on top of the cabin, Kit comes round and throws her knife at Dakota, causing him to fall off the train and plunge to his death in a ravine.

Dawson and his gang ambush the train but cannot catch up with it. However, they manage to shoot holes the boiler. The Emma Sweeny loses steam pressure and slows to a halt within sight of Tomahawk. A posse, headed by Marshall Dodge, rides out from the town and, together with the Araphoe, subdue Dawson's gang. Dawson flees but is pursued by Pawnee, who takes him out by throwing a tomahawk at him.

As the train has stopped just short of its goal, Johnny attempts to talk the mayor of Tomahawk into extending the town limits, thereby fulfilling the requirements of the franchise. He succeeds with seconds to spare. Kit has fallen in love with Johnny, but he says he cannot be with her, as he cannot give up his traveling life. She grabs her knife and threatens to cripple him to prevent him from traveling.

Several years later, Johnny is married to Kit and working as the train conductor. As the train sets off, he limps after it, waving to Kit and their five young daughters, all named after Madame Adelaide's dancers.

Cast
 Dan Dailey as Johnny Behind-the-Deuces
 Anne Baxter as Kit Dodge Jr.
 Rory Calhoun as Dakota
 Walter Brennan as Terence Sweeny
 Charles Kemper as Deputy Chuckity Jones
 Connie Gilchrist as Madame Adelaide
 Arthur Hunnicutt as Sad Eyes
 Will Wright as Dodge
 Chief Yowlachie as Pawnee
 Victor Sen Yung as Dodge
 Marilyn Monroe as Clara (uncredited)
 Olin Howland as Railway Conductor (uncredited)
 George Melford as Stationmaster (uncredited)
 Charles Stevens as Trancos (uncredited)

The Emma Sweeny 

The steam locomotive that stars in the film, known as Emma Sweeny, was actually Rio Grande Southern #20, a 3-foot-gauge 4-6-0 Ten-Wheeler built by the Schenectady Locomotive Works in 1899. To appear older, it was dressed up with a false smokestack, headlight, and various other parts. It was also given a colorful paint scheme. The scenes of Emma Sweeny running under steam were shot on the Denver & Rio Grande Western Railroad's Silverton Branch (now the Durango & Silverton Railroad) north of Rockwood, Colorado, and a shot of the train crossing a large trestle used the Rio Grande Southern Railroad's Lightner Creek Trestle.

For the scenes where the locomotive is pulled by mules while off the track, a full-size wooden replica of RGS #20 was built, as the real locomotive would have been too heavy for the mules to pull. The mules pulled the model over parts of Molas Pass and on Reservoir Hill, which is now the site of Fort Lewis College.

After filming was completed, the replica changed hands several times, eventually being used in Petticoat Junction as a studio stand-in for the Hooterville Cannonball. (The "real" Hooterville Cannonball was Sierra Railway #3, a larger standard-gauge Ten-Wheeler).

The wooden Emma Sweeny model was later put on display in Jackson, California, still in its Hooterville Cannonball appearance. In 2011, it was donated to the Durango Railroad Historical Society, which has restored the model to its Emma Sweeny appearance and placed it on display at Santa Rita Park in Durango, Colorado.

In 2020, Rio Grande Southern #20 returned to operation, having last run in 1951. It was restored over a 14-year period and made its public debut on August 1, 2020. It is now operational and resides at the Colorado Railroad Museum.

Soundtrack

References

External links
 
 
 
 
 

1950 films
1950 musical comedy films
1950s American films
1950s English-language films
1950s historical comedy films
1950s historical musical films
1950s Western (genre) comedy films
1950s Western (genre) musical films
20th Century Fox films
American historical comedy films
American historical musical films
American musical comedy films
American Western (genre) comedy films
American Western (genre) musical films
Films directed by Richard Sale
Films scored by Cyril J. Mockridge
Films set in the 19th century
Films set in Colorado
Films shot in Colorado